The 2020–21 Boston College Eagles women's basketball team represented Boston College during the 2020–21 NCAA Division I women's basketball season. The Eagles were led by third year head coach Joanna Bernabei-McNamee. They played their home games at the Conte Forum and are members of the Atlantic Coast Conference.

The Eagles finished the season 7–12 and 2–11 in ACC play to finish in a thirteenth place.  In the ACC tournament, they defeated Pittsburgh in the First Round before losing to Syracuse in the Second Round.  They were not invited to the NCAA tournament or the WNIT.

Previous season
The Eagles finished the season 20–12 and 11–7 in ACC play to finish in a tie for fourth place.  As the sixth seed in the ACC tournament, they defeated Clemson in the Second Round and Duke in the Quarterfinals before losing to eventual champion NC State in Semifinals.  The NCAA tournament and WNIT were cancelled due to the COVID-19 outbreak.

Off-season

Departures

Recruiting Class

Source:

Roster

Schedule

Source:

|-
!colspan=9 style=| Non Conference Regular season

|-
!colspan=9 style=| ACC Regular season

|-
!colspan=9 style=| ACC Women's Tournament

Rankings

Coaches did not release a Week 2 poll and AP does not release a poll after the NCAA Tournament.

See also
 2020–21 Boston College Eagles men's basketball team

References

Boston College Eagles women's basketball seasons
Boston College
Boston College Eagles women's basketball
Boston College Eagles women's basketball
Boston College Eagles women's basketball
Boston College Eagles women's basketball